Solute carrier family 13 member 3 also called sodium-dependent dicarboxylate transporter (NaDC3) is a protein that in humans is encoded by the SLC13A3 gene.

Mammalian sodium-dicarboxylate cotransporters transport succinate and other Krebs cycle intermediates. They fall into 2 categories based on their substrate affinity: low affinity and high affinity. Both the low- and high-affinity transporters play an important role in the handling of citrate by the kidneys. The protein encoded by this gene represents the high-affinity form. Alternatively spliced transcript variants encoding different isoforms have been found for this gene, although the full-length nature of some of them have not been characterized yet.

See also
 Solute carrier family

References

Further reading

Solute carrier family